Quadrant is an album by jazz guitarist Joe Pass and vibraphonist Milt Jackson that was released in 1977.

Track listing 
"Concorde" (Joe Pass) – 4:14
"Joe's Tune" (Pass) – 4:28
"Oh, Lady be Good!" (George Gershwin, Ira Gershwin) – 7:46
"Ray's Tune" (Ray Brown) – 4:36
"Grooveyard" (Carl Perkins) – 6:57
"The Man I Love" (Gershwin, Gershwin) – 7:47
"Blues for the Stone" (Milt Jackson) – 6:16

Personnel 
Joe Pass - guitar
Milt Jackson – vibes
Ray Brown – bass
Mickey Roker – drums

Chart positions

References 

1977 albums
Joe Pass albums
Milt Jackson albums
Pablo Records albums